Hervey Studdiford Moore Sr. (October 14, 1884 – December 11, 1947) was a member of the New Jersey General Assembly representing Mercer County, New Jersey in 1913 through 1914 and again in 1919.

Biography
He was born in Trenton, New Jersey on October 14, 1884, to Mary R. Bradley and William Randolph Moore. He attended Trenton Central High School, the University of Pennsylvania and Georgetown University.

He married Lillian Mary Field and they had Hervey Studdiford Moore Jr. (1916-1995).

He died on December 11, 1947, in Trenton, New Jersey. He was buried in First Presbyterian Church of Ewing Cemetery in Ewing, New Jersey.

References

External links

1884 births
1947 deaths
University of Pennsylvania alumni
Georgetown University alumni
Republican Party members of the New Jersey General Assembly
Politicians from Trenton, New Jersey
Trenton Central High School alumni
20th-century American politicians